Santiam Christian Schools is a private pre K-12 Christian school in Adair Village, Oregon, United States.

Opened in 1979, the school has been accredited through the Northwest Accreditation Commission since 1993, and the Association of Christian Schools International.

History
Santiam Christian currently resides on the previous location of Camp Adair. Several of Camp Adair's buildings are in use by Santiam Christian. All that really remains is the E. E. Wilson Wildlife Area. In 1978 Parents began planning to establish a Christian highschool. Santiam Christian High School was founded in 1979. SC offered grades 9, 10 and 11 with an enrollment of 55 students. In June 1980 Santiam Christian moved to Adair Village. In 1981 SC graduated its first class of 20 students. In 1986 the purchase of 12 buildings and 16.5 acres from US Government was finalized for $1. In 1991 Heritage Christian Elementary officially merged with SC adding grades K-6.

Accreditation
Santiam Christian High School is fully accredited by the Association of Christian Schools International (ACSI) and Northwest Accreditation Commission (NWAC), and meets all requirements for graduation of the Oregon State Department of Education.

High school

High school activities
Santiam Christian is involved with Future Farmers of America, International Missions Trips, and other electives courses and extra-curricular activities.

High school sports
Sports offered to students include: Football, Volleyball, Boys and Girls Soccer, Cross Country, Boys and Girls Basketball, Wrestling, Track & Field, Baseball, and Softbal. The school competes as part of the OSAA's Mountain  Valley Conference.

Athletic achievements
Member of Oregon School Activities Association (OSAA) – 3A Division/Mountain Valley Conference. Sports include: Football, Volleyball, Cross-Country, Soccer, Basketball, Wrestling, Baseball, Softball, Track, and Cheer-leading.

33 Oregon State Championships and 81 League (District) Championships in a variety of sports

Other achievements
The Oregonian Cup is awarded to the top overall school in the state, based on size. Of the 15 years that this prestigious recognition has been given, SC has ranked first 10 times and second 4 times.

Multiple Choir State Championships

Outstanding Drama Department with three-four yearly productions

Award-winning yearbook, year after year

Graduates
1,772 students have graduated from Santiam Christian High School. Approximately 85% of the graduating seniors in 2015 are now attending colleges and universities, and were offered over $4.1 million in scholarship dollars.

Notable alumni
Bryan Curb - Emmy winner, producer/director/editor

Shelly Boshart Davis - Oregon House of Representatives

Isaac Seumalo - NFL football player, Super Bowl champion, Philadelphia Eagles

Jeffrey Hendrix - former professional baseball player

Transportation
Bus routes are provided into Albany, Corvallis, Monmouth, Dallas, Independence, and Salem.

Middle school extracurricular activities

Students in middle school can become involved with the Junior Players Drama, LEGO Robotics, SC Boy Scout Troop 516, elective courses, Chorale, and Junior High Band, and other activities.

References

High schools in Benton County, Oregon
Private middle schools in Oregon
Educational institutions established in 1979
Christian schools in Oregon
Education in Benton County, Oregon
Schools accredited by the Northwest Accreditation Commission
Private elementary schools in Oregon
Private high schools in Oregon
1979 establishments in Oregon